Abu al-Hasan Ahmad ibn Yahya ibn Ishaq al-Rawandi, commonly known as Ibn al-Rawandi (‎ 827–911 CE), was an early Persian scholar and theologian. In his early days, he was a Mu'tazilite scholar, but then rejected the Mu'tazilite doctrine. Afterwards, he became a Shia scholar; there is some debate about whether he stayed a Shia until his death or became a skeptic, though most sources confirm his eventual rejection of all religion and becoming an atheist. Although none of his works have survived, his opinions had been preserved through his critics and the surviving books that answered him. His book with the most preserved fragments (through an Ismaili book refuting Al-Rawandi's ideology) is the Kitab al-Zumurrud (The Book of the Emerald).

Life 
Abu al-Husayn Ahmad bin Yahya ben Isaac al-Rawandi was born in 827 CE in Greater Khorasan, modern-day northwest Afghanistan. Al-Rawandi was born in Basra during the reign of the Abbasid Caliph Al-Ma'mun. His father, Yahya, was a Persian Jewish scholar who converted to Islam and schooled Muslims on refuting the Talmud.

He joined the Mu'tazili of Baghdad and gained prominence among them. However, he eventually became estranged from his fellow Mu'tazilites and formed close alliances with Shia Muslims and then with non-Muslims (Manichaeans, Jews and perhaps also Christians). Al-Rawandi then became a follower of the Manichaean zindiq Abu Isa al-Warraq before eventually rejecting religion in general, writing several books that criticized all religion, particularly Islam.

Philosophy 
Most sources agree that he spent time as a Mu'tazilite and a Shia before eventually denouncing all religion. Some sources look for the roots of his views in his connections with Shia Islam and Mu'tazilia, and claim that his heresy was exaggerated by his rivals.

Ibn al-Rawandi spent time as a Mu'tazilite and later a Shia scholar before eventually turning to atheism. Most of his 114 books have been lost, but those with at least some remaining fragments include The Scandal of the Mu'tazilites (Fadihat al-mu'tazila), which presents the arguments of various Mu'tazilite theologians and then makes the case that they are internally inconsistent, The Refutation (ad-Damigh), which attacks the Quran, and The Book of the Emerald (Kitab al-zumurrud) which critiques prophecy and rejects Islam. Among his arguments, he critiques dogma as antithetical to reason, argues miracles are fake, that prophets (including Muhammad) are just magicians, and that the Paradise as described by the Quran is not desirable.<ref>{{cite book |last1=Groff |first1=Peter |title=Islamic Philosophy A-Z |date=2007 |publisher=Edinburgh University Press Ltd. |location=Edinburgh |isbn=978-0-7486-2089-0 |pages=86–87 |quote=In these works alone, he (1) rejects all religious dogmas as unacceptable to reason, (2) argues that prophets - Muhammad included - are like sorcerers and magicians, and that their miracles are entirely fictitious, (3) questions the necessity of prophecy and revelation if God is indeed all-powerful, (4) denies that the Qur'an is the revealed word of God and that it has any unique aesthetic value, (5) maintains that the God of the Quran is ultimately all-too-human and imperfect (i.e. lacking in knowledge and wisdom, easily angered, quick to punish, excessive, arbitrary, and unjust), (6) argues that the world is eternal and we are by no means compelled to posit a first divine cause, and (7) points out that Paradise as described in the Qur'an does not seem particularly desirable.}}</ref>

Some scholars also try to account for the more positive view of Ibn al-Rawandi in some Muslim sources. Josef van Ess has suggested an original interpretation that aims at accommodating all the contradictory information. He notes that the sources which portray Ibn al-Rawandi as a heretic are predominantly Mutazilite and stem from Iraq, whereas in eastern texts he appears in a more positive light. As an explanation for this difference, van Ess suggests "a collision of two different intellectual traditions," i.e., those in Iran and in Iraq. He further suggests that Ibn al-Rawandi's notoriety was the result of the fact that after Ibn al-Rawandi left Baghdad, "his colleagues in Baghdad ... profiting from his absence ... could create a black legend." In other words, van Ess believes that Ibn al-Rawandi, although eccentric and disputatious, was not a heretic at all. However, these views are discounted by most scholars given the weight of evidence to the contrary.

 Subjects discussed in the Kitab al-Zumurrud 

 Muslim traditions 
According to the Zumurrud, traditions concerning miracles are inevitably problematic. At the time of the performance of a supposed miracle, only a small number of people could be close enough to the Prophet to observe his deeds. Reports given by such a small number of people cannot be trusted, for such a small group can easily have conspired to lie. The Muslim tradition thus falls into the category of flimsy traditions, those based on a single authority (khabar al-ahad) rather than on multiple authorities (khabar mutawatir). These religious traditions are lies endorsed by conspiracies.

The Zumurrud points out that Muhammad's own presuppositions (wad) and system (qanun) show that religious traditions are not trustworthy. The Jews and Christians say that Jesus really died, but the Qu'ran contradicts them.

Ibn al-Rawandi also points out specific Muslim traditions, and tries to show that they are laughable. The tradition that the angels rallied round to help Muhammad is not logical, because it implies that the angels of Badr were weaklings, able to kill only seventy of the Prophet's enemies. And if the angels were willing to help Muhammad at Badr, where were they at Uhud when their help was so badly needed?

The Zumurrud criticizes prayer, preoccupation with ritual purity, and the ceremonies of the hajj; throwing stones, circumambulating a house that cannot respond to prayers, running between stones that can neither help nor harm. It goes on to ask why Safa and Marwa are venerated and what difference there is between them and any other hill in the vicinity of Mecca, for example, the hill of Abu Qubays, and why the Kaaba is any better than any other house.

From the Encyclopaedia of Islam'':

See also 
 Turan Dursun
 Baron d'Holbach

Further reading

References

External links 
Mehmet Karabela, IBN AL-RAWANDI,The Oxford Encyclopedia of Philosophy, Science, and Technology in Islam, vol. 1, New York: Oxford University Press, 2014 
Encyclopedia Iranica, "EBN RĀVANDĪ, ABU’l-ḤOSAYN AḤMAD" b. Yaḥyā (d. 910?), Muʿtazilite theologian and “heretic” of Ḵorāsānī origin 
 The blinding emerald: Ibn al-Rawandi's 'Kitab al-Zumurrud.'
 İşte 1.000 yıl önceki Turan Dursun in Turkish.

827 births
911 deaths
Critics of Sunni Islam
Freethought
Former Muslims
Rawandi
Iranian people of Jewish descent
Rawandi
People from Kashan